Carrying Your Love with Me is the seventeenth studio album by the American country music artist George Strait, released in 1997. It was released by MCA Nashville and it produced four singles for Strait on the Billboard country charts. "One Night at a Time", the title track, and "Round About Way", respectively the first, second, and fourth singles, all reached Number One, while "Today My World Slipped Away" (a cover of a Vern Gosdin song) reached #3. Eddie Kilgallon, then a member of the band Ricochet, co-wrote "One Night at a Time". The album has been certified 3× Multi-Platinum by the RIAA for shipping three million copies in the U.S. "Carrying Your Love with Me" was nominated for Best Country Album at the 1998 Grammy Awards.

The song "She'll Leave You with a Smile" is not to be confused with another song with the same name which Strait recorded on his 2001 album The Road Less Traveled. This latter song, which was written by Odie Blackmon and Jay Knowles, was released by Strait in 2002, and became a Number One for him that year.

Track listing

Personnel
Eddie Bayers – drums
Stuart Duncan – fiddle, mandolin
Paul Franklin – pedal steel guitar
Steve Gibson – acoustic guitar, electric guitar
Liana Manis – background vocals
Brent Mason – electric guitar, acoustic guitar, gut string guitar
Steve Nathan – Hammond B-3 organ
Matt Rollings – piano
George Strait – lead vocals
Biff Watson – acoustic guitar
Glenn Worf – bass guitar
Curtis Young – background vocals

Strings on "The Nerve", "She'll Leave You with a Smile", and "Today My World Slipped Away" performed by the Nashville String Machine; arranged and conducted by Michael Omartian, except "Today My World Slipped Away", arranged by Bergen White and conducted by Michael Omartian.

Charts

Weekly charts

Year-end charts

References

1997 albums
George Strait albums
MCA Records albums
Albums produced by Tony Brown (record producer)